Coreeda is a style of folk wrestling practiced in Australia and is based on Aboriginal combat sports that existed in the pre-colonial period before the 19th century.

History
Although centered mainly in the Western Suburbs of Sydney, new Coreeda clubs have recently been formed in Bourke (Western NSW), Melbourne and on the Gold Coast with other new ones planned for Adelaide, Broome and Canberra. Combining the movements of the traditional kangaroo dance as a warm up ritual, with a style of wrestling that utilizes a yellow 4.5 meter diameter circle that has black and red borders (similar to the Aboriginal flag), Coreeda is often compared to sports as diverse as capoeira and sumo.

Developed since 1998 the sport has slowly grown and the Coreeda Association of Australia is now a member of the UNESCO acknowledged World Martial Arts Union, as such is considered an important part of the Intangible Cultural Heritage of Australia. Although Coreeda still struggles for recognition within its own country, the plan for the Coreeda Association of Australia is to one day create a "First Nations Coreeda Championship", with teams selected to represent indigenous nations rather than modern Australian regions and to ultimately to build a professional league for the sport called ProCor.

Other wrestling styles
Coreeda wrestlers often participate in other styles of folk wrestling practiced in Australia at ethnic community festivals, such as Korean Ssireum, Turkish Yagli Gures, Celtic Wrestling, Russian Sambo and have even represented Australia at international Sumo tournaments. Most recently Shane Parker, who began his coreeda training in childhood, competed at the 2010 Delhi Commonwealth Games for the Australian Greco-Roman Wrestling team and it is an important part of the philosophy of the sport that Coreeda wrestlers regularly test themselves in other styles of wrestling, believing that this promotes world peace.

Aboriginal wrestling
Aboriginal wrestling sports were popular before European settlement and served a threefold purpose, as a form of martial art training for young warriors in preparation for tribal warfare, as a ritualistic method to control hostilities during intertribal gatherings and most importantly as a pure way to have fun.

Legend and history
The legendary Dreaming account of how Coreeda first came into being was told in the Ngiyampaa Nation of Western NSW and is about a lizard man named Beereun, who was told by a giant snake to watch the Red Kangaroo bucks so he could learn how to fight without weapons. He then brought these fighting techniques back to his clan and initiated a wrestling tournament as an important peace-keeping ceremony, which instigated an era of great prosperity for the Ngiyampaa people. Based on the dating of rock art at sites like Mt Grenfell near Cobar in Western NSW, it is estimated this first Coreeda tournament began over 10,000 years ago, making Coreeda one of the oldest documented styles of Folk Wrestling in the world.

Official ties
The Coreeda Association of Australia has built strong ties with the Australian Sports Commission through the National Sporting Organization "Wrestling Australia Inc" and is recognized as the only existing Australian Folk Style of Wrestling. As an independent sporting body it has also formed a new confederation with such organizations as the Australian Sumo Federation, the Australian Ssireum Association, Turk Wrestling Australia, the Association of Australian Celtic Wrestlers, Mongol Bukh Australia, the African Wrestling & Sports Federation of Australia and Sambo Australia Inc, called the Australian Society of Traditional Wrestlers. United by an "in principle agreement" to help support each other in growth and development, the Society has already arranged some very big traditional wrestling tournaments, with many more planned for the near future.

References

External links
   Coreeda Oz
   Wrestling's Best

Indigenous Australian sport
Sports originating in Australia
Combat sports
Folk wrestling styles
Oceanian martial arts
Wrestling in Australia